Open Window may refer to:

 Open Window (album), a 2004 album by Robert Rich
 Open Window (film), a 2006 American film written and directed by Mia Goldman
 The Open Window (Matisse), a 1905 painting by Henri Matisse
 The Open Window (Bonnard), a 1921 painting Pierre Bonnard
 "The Open Window", a story by Saki
 The Open Window, a 1954 stage drama written by Lenore Coffee and William Joyce Cowen.